Origin of the word from Greek Mythology, Cabeiri, a group of Grecian deities

Cabiri may also refer to:

Computing 
 Cabiri, a UK based E-commerce system integration company

Fiction 
 Cabiri, A demon lord in Dungeons & Dragons

Non-Profit Groups 
 The Cabiri, a Seattle-based performance troupe

Places 
 Cabiri, Angola